Belfast East was a borough constituency of the Parliament of Northern Ireland from 1921 to 1929. It returned four MPs, using proportional representation by means of the single transferable vote.

Boundaries
Belfast East was created by the Government of Ireland Act 1920 and contained the Dock, Pottinger and Victoria wards of the County Borough of Belfast. The House of Commons (Method of Voting and Redistribution of Seats) Act (Northern Ireland) 1929 divided the constituency into four constituencies elected under first past the post: Belfast Bloomfield, Belfast Dock, Belfast Pottinger and Belfast Victoria constituencies.

Second Dáil
In May 1921, Dáil Éireann, the parliament of the self-declared Irish Republic run by Sinn Féin, passed a resolution declaring that elections to the House of Commons of Northern Ireland and the House of Commons of Southern Ireland would be used as the election for the Second Dáil. All those elected were on the roll of the Second Dáil, but as no Sinn Féin MP was elected for Belfast East, it was not represented there.

Politics
Belfast East was a predominantly Unionist area with some pockets of labour strength, returning four Unionists in 1921 and 2 Unionists, 1 Independent Unionist and a Northern Ireland Labour Party MP in 1925.

Members of Parliament

Election results

References

Northern Ireland Parliament constituencies established in 1921
Northern Ireland Parliament constituencies disestablished in 1929
Constituencies of the Northern Ireland Parliament
Constituencies of the Northern Ireland Parliament in Belfast
Dáil constituencies in Northern Ireland (historic)